The 2015 Borno State gubernatorial election occurred on April 11, 2015. Incumbent Governor APC's Kashim Shettima won election for a second term, defeating PDP's Gambo Lawan and several minor party candidates. Shettima received 94.92% of the vote.

Kashim Shettima emerged unopposed in the APC gubernatorial primary after all the aspirants stepped down. He retained his deputy, Zannah Mustapha, as his running mate.

Gambo Lawan was the PDP candidate.

Electoral system
The Governor of Borno State is elected using the plurality voting system.

Primary election

APC primary
The APC primary election was held on in the evening of Friday, December 4, 2014, at the Elkanemi Sports Centre in Maiduguri, with a total of 4,520 delegates present from all wards of the state's 27 LGAs. Incumbent governor, Kashim Shettima, became the party's sole candidate after other aspirants stepped down for him days before.

Candidates
Party nominee: Kashim Shettima: Incumbent governor.
Running mate: Zannah Mustapha.

PDP primary
The PDP primary election was held in December 2014. Gambori Lawan emerged winner. However, following a replacement of his name with that of Mohammed Imam, he filed a suit at a federal high court in Abuja, which ordered the party to return his name.

Candidates
Party nominee: Gambo Lawan.
Running mate:

Results
APC Governor Kashim Shettima won re-election for a second term, defeating PDP Gambo Lawan and several minor party candidates. Shettima received 94.92% of the votes, while Lawan received 5.08%.

The total number of registered voters in the state was 1,407,777 while the total number of votes cast was 690,182.

By local government area
Here are the results of the election from 20 of the 27 local government areas of the state for the two major parties. Blue represents LGAs won by Shettima. Green represents LGAs won by Lawan.

References 

Borno State gubernatorial elections
Borno State gubernatorial election